The LZ 59  (L 20) was a World War I German Navy Airship and was the first Q-Class zeppelin with a then record length of . It was allocated the tactical numbering L 20 and carried out a total of 19 flights, including 2 raids on England and 10 reconnaissance missions.

Construction 
The LZ 59 was built by Luftschiffbau Zeppelin in Friedrichshafen, Germany, during the First World War. It was built to join the ranks of the German Kaiserliche Marine in the fight against the United Kingdom. The ship had room to carry 18 crew members in her two gondolas.

War career 
The LZ 59 conducted its first flight on 21 December 1915 from Friedrichshafen to Tønder. The first flight was commanded by Kapitänleutnant Franz Stabbert with first officer Lieutenant Ernst Schirlitz, but the ship did not see action in the war until 1916. It was stationed in Tønder from 18 January 1916 to 21 February 1916 and in Seddin near Slupsk, Poland before being flown back to Tønder on 6 April 1916.

Bombing raids on the English Midlands 
The LZ 59 conducted its first bombing raid on Britain on the night of 31 January and 1 February 1916. The ship took off together with L 19 from Tønder and joined 9 other naval airships whose objective was to destroy the docks in Liverpool, as well as other targets in the English midlands. The raid was personally led by airship fleet manager Peter Strasser who was on the L 11.

The viaduct, however, emerged with only superficial marks from shrapnel, which are visible to this day, and no fatalities were reported. The next target for LZ 59 was the Stanton steelworks, located south of Ilkeston. The ship dropped 15 bombs on its intended target, of which one bomb hit the railway bridge over Nutbrook Canal, killing 2 people. Two of the bombs fell on the Rushes stores in the center of the town and the other two near the Empress plant to the east. The attack on Loughborough led to 12 people being injured and the death of ten of the town's inhabitants, including Mary Anne Page and two of her children, whose names can be seen on a plaque in Loughborough Carillon Park.

[[File:Bennerley Viaduct - geograph.org.uk - 15955.jpg|thumb|The Bennerley Viaduct, which was spared from the LZ 59'''s first bombing raid]]LZ 59 flew  westward and bombarded Burton-upon-Trent at 8:45pm. One of the bombs dropped on the city landed between the Christchurch and the mission house in Uxbridge Street, where over 200 people had gathered. The following explosion injured 72 and killed 6 people, including guest missionary Mary Rose Morris from Brighton, who died while hugging her Bible. LZ 59 also dropped 12 firebombs on the city, which damaged some houses and 2 breweries. The bombardment of Burton-upon-Trent ended up killing a total of 15 people.

As the night passed, all of the airships were ordered to return to their bases. In the end, none of the nine airships reached Liverpool, however a great deal of damage was done to the English midlands and many British citizens died in the attacks. The German army ended up losing one airship, the L 19, which was forced to crash land in the North Sea leading to the death of everyone on board. An English ship had rushed to the surviving crew's aid, but ended up abandoning them.

After the air raid LZ 59 was given the nickname Raider of Loughborough due to the city's damage and the high death toll.

 May 1916 bombing raid and crash LZ 59 started its second bombing raid on Britain during the night of 2 May and 3 May 1916. The ship left its base in Tønder and joined 6 other airships to conduct another bombing raid against a number of factories, smelters and railways in Middlesbrough, Stockton-on-Tees and Hartlepool in northeast England. Another target for the airships were some enemy warships at the mouth of the Firth of Forth near Edinburgh, Scotland.

After the air raid the airships returned safely to their bases except LZ 59, which was having problems with one of its four engines and also encountered strong winds from the southeast, which increased to a moderate gale. The wind blew the ship north past Peterhead and out to the North Sea towards neutral Norway. Commander Stabbert decided to attempt an emergency landing at Gandsfjorden near Sandnes due to the low amount of gasoline left in the airship's fuel tanks.

The airship passed west of Sandnes and Lura at a low altitude in order to go beyond Gandsfjorden and into the inner fjords south of Stavanger. Around 11:00am, the airship touched down in a fairly calm fjord, where it dipped its nose and front gondola a few times in the water. Commander Stabbert ordered the crew to jump in the water, Lieutenant Schirlitz and six sailors followed the commander's orders and jumped overboard. Two officers swam ashore to Dale, while the sailors were rescued by a small fishing boat captained by Jeremiah Bykle. However, there were still 8 men on board the airship, which started to gain height again as it was relieved of weight. The wind took the airship northwest before its anchor caught a large rock on Heddå mountain. The shock of the sudden stop detached one of the gondolas, which fell to the ground with four men on board, of whom 3 died. The airship rose again and flew further to Hafrsfjord before it slowly fell into the water near Jåsund at 11:55am. Shortly before it hit the water and broke in half, one man jumped out the ship and the last three crewmen were rescued by a torpedo boat.

 Aftermath 
On 4 May 1916 at 9:00am the wind turned toward the northeast and drove the wreck of the airship towards the stone coast of Sør-Sunde. As a result, the gondola and motors were crushed and the ship's machine guns fell into the water.

 Internment of the crew 
Some of the crew were interned on the German auxiliary cruiser Berlin in Trondheimsfjord, where they remained until the end of the war. Six other crew members, including an officer, were interned in Madlalejren and were released shortly after. Commander Stabbert fled after 6 months of internment and returned to the airship base in Tønder on 20 December 1916.

 Legacy 
The LZ 59 will always be remembered as the Raider of Loughborough'' to the people of Britain.

References

Accidents and incidents involving balloons and airships
Accidents and incidents involving military aircraft
Airships of the Imperial German Navy
Aviation accidents and incidents in Norway
1910s German bomber aircraft
Hydrogen airships
Zeppelins
Airships of Germany
Airships
1915 in Germany
Aircraft first flown in 1915
Rigid airships